The Patrons of Industry in Canada were based on the Patrons of Industry of Michigan that had formed in 1889. It was dedicated to upholding and encouraging the moral, social, intellectual, political and financial situation of farmers and to preserve the way of life that existed in farming communities in the late nineteenth century against encroaching industrialization. It cooperated with the urban labour movement to address the political frustrations of both groups with big business.

The Patrons' first appearance in Canada was The Grand Association of the Patrons of Industry in Ontario, founded in 1890.  It declared itself independent of the U.S. group in 1891.

Although centred in Ontario, the organization branched out into Manitoba (see Patrons of Industry in Manitoba), Alberta, Quebec and the Maritime provinces. The Patrons' membership exceeded 30,000 at its peak.

In the Maritimes, the Patrons of industry had some successes but soon collapsed. in the 1895 New Brunswick general election, two Patrons of Industry MLAs were elected.
Duncan Marshall in 1895 established more than eighty lodges in Prince Edward Island alone. He also edited a Charlottetown weekly newspaper "The Patron of Industry". He contested a by-election in 1896 but the organization was unable to break into the established two-party alignment in the province and was soundly defeated. Marshal left the province soon after the election (and would go on to be a cabinet minister in Alberta and in Ontario), and the movement in the region collapsed.

The Patrons ran candidates in the 1894 Ontario provincial election. Three Patrons of Industry candidates were elected, and 13 other members of the Legislative Assembly were elected with Patrons of Industry support — 12 Liberals and one Conservative.

The Patrons of Industry ran 31 candidates (including three in Manitoba and one in Quebec) in the 1896 federal election (see below). Several, including David Dickson Rogers, William Varney Pettet, John Tolmie and Douglas Moffat, were elected, Rogers by acclamation.

The party was soon divided on the question of cooperation with the Ontario Liberal Party, and the group was virtually extinct by 1900. Both Rogers and Pettet ran for re-election in the 1900 federal election but not under the Patrons banner.

The party achieved a few gains for farmers, such as institution of a cooling-off period to ban Ontario defeated politicians from holding office in government for one year after defeat and a cut in tariffs effected in 1894.

1896 federal candidates

Manitoba
W. Postlethwhaite, Brandon
Charles Baithwaite, Macdonald
G. A. I. A. Marshall, Marquette

Ontario
James Tolton, Bruce East
John G. Adams, Cornwall and Stormont
Charles Jonas Thornton, Durham West
J. P. Martyn, Elgin East
Alexander A. McKillop, Elgin West
Daniel Willis Mason, Essex North
David Dickson Rogers, Frontenac
James Lockie Wilson, Glengarry
James Bowes, Grey East
William Allan, Grey South
S. A. Beck, Haldimand and Monck
James Balcanquel, Hastings East
G. Mcl. Kilty, Huron West
James Miller, Lanark North 
James H. Horton, Leeds South
E. B. Switzer, Lennox
William McGuire, Norfolk North
George Walker, Norfolk South
C. A. Mallory, Northumberland East
John C. Rosevear, Northumberland West
Duncan Graham, Ontario North
Henry Joseph Cloran, Prescott
William Varney Pettet, Prince Edward
Robert A. Jamieson, Renfrew South
D. C. Anderson, Simcoe East
Thomas W. Lennox, Simcoe South
John Brown, York West

Quebec
Francis F. Wellard, Compton

Further reading

References

See also
 United Farmers 
 List of political parties in Canada
 Patrons of Industry in Manitoba

Federal political parties in Canada
Defunct provincial political parties in Ontario
Agrarian parties in Canada
Defunct agrarian political parties
Defunct political parties in Canada
Political parties established in 1890
1890 establishments in Canada